Peter Hermann (born 16 October 1963) is a retired male track cyclist from Liechtenstein, who competed for his native country in three events at the 1988 Summer Olympics in Seoul, South Korea. His best result was finishing in 21st place in the Men's 1,000 metres Time Trial.

References

1963 births
Living people
Liechtenstein male cyclists
Liechtenstein track cyclists
Cyclists at the 1988 Summer Olympics
Olympic cyclists of Liechtenstein